was a Japanese Nippon Professional Baseball player with the Nankai Hawks. He debuted in the 1958 and went on to join the Japanese Baseball Hall of Fame for his skills as a pitcher. he won the Japanese Triple Crown in (1959)

Early life 
Sugiura was born in Agemo (later Toyota), Aichi. He was not famous in high school, but became a well-known pitcher after entering Rikkyo University. Shigeo Nagashima entered the university at the same year. He changed his pitching style to Sidearm in his second year of university, because of his trouble with his glasses.

In Tokyo Big6 Baseball League, his team became a champion at Spring League and Autumn League in 1957, and pitched a no-hitter in a game against Waseda.

External links
 

1935 births
2001 deaths
People from Toyota, Aichi
Baseball people from Aichi Prefecture
Rikkyo University alumni
Japanese baseball players
Nankai Hawks players
Managers of baseball teams in Japan
Japanese Baseball Hall of Fame inductees
Fukuoka SoftBank Hawks managers
Nippon Professional Baseball Rookie of the Year Award winners
Nippon Professional Baseball MVP Award winners